The Yuriy Karmazin Bloc was an electoral alliance in Ukraine created in December 2005.

At the 2006 parliamentary elections the alliance won 0,65% of the popular vote and no seats.
 
The alliance had the following members:
 All-Ukrainian Party of Peace and Unity
 Party of Defenders of Homeland
 Party "National Democratic Union "Ukraine"

References

Defunct political party alliances in Ukraine